The culture of Liverpool incorporates a wide range of activities within the city of Liverpool, England. The city is an important centre for culture not just in the northwest of England, but also the United Kingdom more broadly. Its contributions to culture internationally were recognised in 2008, when it was named the European Capital of Culture.

Capital of Culture 

On 4 June 2008, Liverpool was named a European Capital of Culture for 2008, the other site being Stavanger, Norway.

Literature 
Beryl Bainbridge, one of England's greatest contemporary writers, grew up in Liverpool. Many of her stories are set there.

A number of notable authors have visited Liverpool including Daniel Defoe, Washington Irving, Thomas De Quincey, Herman Melville, Nathaniel Hawthorne, Charles Dickens, Gerard Manley Hopkins and Hugh Walpole all of whom spent extended periods in the city. Hawthorne was stationed in Liverpool as United States consul between 1853 and 1856.
Although he is not known to have ever visited Liverpool, Jung famously had a vivid dream of the city which he analysed in one of his works.

Music 

Liverpool was the centre in the 1960s of Merseybeat and since then has been home to a music scene. The city is also home to the UK's oldest-established orchestra, the Royal Liverpool Philharmonic Orchestra, headquartered in the Philharmonic Hall, and a youth orchestra. Max Bruch was one of numerous notable conductors of the RLPO, and dedicated his Kol Nidre to the Jewish community in the city. Sir Edward Elgar dedicated his famous Pomp and Circumstance No.1 to the Liverpool Orchestral Society, and the piece had its first performance in the city in 1901. Among Liverpool's curiosities, the Austrian émigré Fritz Spiegl is notable. He not only became a world expert on the etymology of Scouse, but composed the music to Z-Cars and the Radio 4 UK Theme.

Poetry 
During the late 1960s the city became well known for the Liverpool poets, who include Roger McGough and the late Adrian Henri. An anthology of poems, The Mersey Sound, written by Henri, McGough and Brian Patten, has sold over 500,000 copies since first being published in 1967.

Theatre 
Liverpool also has a history of performing arts, reflected every summer in its annual theatrical highlight, the Liverpool Shakespeare Festival, and by the number of theatres in the city. These include the Empire, Everyman, Playhouse, Neptune, Royal Court, and Unity Theatres. The Everyman, Unity, and Playhouse Theatres all run their own theatre companies.

Visual arts 

Liverpool has more galleries and national museums than any other city in the United Kingdom apart from London. National Museums Liverpool is the only English national collection based wholly outside London. The Tate Liverpool gallery houses the modern art collection of the Tate in the North of England and was, until the opening of Tate Modern, the largest exhibition space dedicated to modern art in the United Kingdom. The FACT centre hosts touring multimedia exhibitions, whilst the Walker Art Gallery houses an extensive collection of Pre-Raphaelites. Sudley House contains another major collection of pre-20th-century art, and the number of galleries continues to expand: Ceri Hand Gallery opened in 2008, exhibiting primarily contemporary art, and Liverpool University's Victoria Building was re-opened as a public art gallery and museum to display the University's artwork and historical collections which include the second-largest display of art by Audubon outside the US.

Artists have also come from the city, including painter George Stubbs who was born in Liverpool in 1724.

The Liverpool Biennial festival of arts runs from mid-September to late November and comprises three main sections; the International, The Independents and New Contemporaries although fringe events are timed to coincide. It was during the 2004 festival that Yoko Ono's work "My mother is beautiful" caused widespread public protest when photographs of a naked woman's pubic area were exhibited on the main shopping street. Despite protests the work remained in place.

See also
 Architecture of Liverpool
 List of public art in Liverpool

References 

 
Liverpool